Jacob Lalrawngbawla (born 8 June 1995) is an Indian football player playing for Shillong Lajong in the I-League in India as a midfielder.

Career

Shillong Lajong

Jacob is a youth product of Shillong Lajong. He joined the youth set up in 2010. A talented youngster, Jacob was selected for a training camp in FC Bayern Munich in July 2011. Impressive performances saw him graduate to the senior team at the start of 2012-13 season along with two other academy boys. He made his professional debut on 12 October 2012 at the age of 17 when he came on as a substitute in an I-League game against Salgaocar F.C. Shillong Lajong coach Des Bulpin has hailed Jacob Lalrawngbawla as a "brilliant talent."

References

External links
 Profile at Goal.com
 Profile at I-league.org
 

1995 births
Living people
People from Aizawl district
Indian footballers
Shillong Lajong FC players
I-League players
Footballers from Mizoram
India youth international footballers
Association football midfielders